Sheila Nevins (born April 6, 1939) is an American television producer and head of MTV Documentary Films division of MTV Studios. Previously, Nevins was the President of HBO Documentary Films. She has produced over 1,000 documentary films for HBO and is one of the most influential people in documentary filmmaking. She has worked on productions that have been recognized with 35 News and Documentary Emmy Awards, 42 Peabody Awards, and 26 Academy Awards. Nevins has won 31 individual Primetime Emmy Awards, more than any other person. She is also a member of
the Peabody Awards board of directors, which is presented by the University of Georgia's Henry W. Grady College of Journalism and Mass Communication.

Early life and education 
Nevins was born to a Jewish family on the Lower East Side of Manhattan in New York City to Stella Nevins (née Rosenberg), a chemist, and Benjamin Nevins, a Russian immigrant post office worker who was also a bookie. Nevins' family was very poor and her mother suffered from an acute form of Raynaud's disease, which resulted in amputations of her limbs, and scleroderma. Nevins has a younger sister (born 1946) who is a doctor.

Due to the generosity of her uncle, who was a wealthy inventor, Nevins attended private schools growing up. Nevins attended Little Red School House and the High School of Performing Arts in New York City.

She received a BA in English from Barnard College in 1960. In 1963 she received an MFA in Directing from the Yale School of Drama, where she was one of two women in the directing program.

Career 
In the 1960s, Nevins began her career at the United States Information Agency in Washington, D.C. She was hired to play a secretary in the USIA TV series called Adventures in English, which was created to teach English vocabulary, which her character repeated, in foreign countries. Nevins then worked as a researcher, cataloging historical footage about World War II at the Library of Congress. Nevins said that this immersive work inspired her to shift focus from the fictional world of theater to the fact-based world of documented in film.

From 1970 to 1973, after moving back to New York, Nevins apprenticed with director Don Mischer and producer Bob Squire. Nevins then got a job as a researcher on Al Perlmutter's on the groundbreaking Channel 13 TV show The Great American Dream Machine, eventually working her way up to doing segments and "man on the street" interviews. Nevins also worked as a director. Inspired by the film Salesman, she hired Albert and David Maysles to direct parts of the show.

In 1973, Nevins was a Field Producer for The Reasoner Report on ABC News.

From 1973 to 1975, Nevins wrote for Time-Life Films. She worked briefly for 20/20. Nevins declined Don Hewitt's invitation to be a producer for 60 Minutes.

In 1975 she began working as a writer and producer for the Children's Television Workshop. She also worked at Scribner making recordings of books for blind people. Nevins was a researcher then associate producer for The Great American Dream Machine on National Educational Television.

In 1978 and 1979, Nevins was a producer for the CBS News magazine Who's Who.

HBO 
In 1979, Nevins was hired by HBO as Director of Documentary Programming on a 13-week contract. She continued in that position until 1982.

From 1983 to 1985, Nevins had a production company called Spinning Reels and created the animated educational program Braingames.

In 1986, Nevins returned to HBO as Vice President of Documentary Programming. In 1995, she became the Senior Vice President of Original Programming. Nevin's tenure at HBO saw the rise of sexually-themed programming in the America Undercover documentary series.

From 1999 to 2003, Nevins was the Executive Vice President of Original Programming at HBO. In 1998, Nevins said that she produced 12 documentaries a year at HBO, with budgets that were typically US$600,000 in 1998 dollars.

Nevins was HBO's President of Documentary and Family Programming since 2004.

In March 2018, Nevins retired from her position at HBO.

Writing 
In 2007, Nevins wrote the foreword to the book Addiction: Why Can't They Just Stop?, which was based on the HBO documentary series of the same name, and was produced in association with the Robert Wood Johnson Foundation and the National Institute on Alcohol Abuse and Alcoholism.

In 2017, Nevins published a memoir, You Don't Look Your Age... and Other Fairy Tales. Nevins explores concepts of aging, youth, and experience. Some of the book features lightly fictionalized vignettes and poetry. Kathy Bates, Gloria Vanderbilt, Lily Tomlin, Martha Stewart, Meryl Streep, RuPaul, among many others, contributed audio performances to the audio version of the book.

Personal life
In 1963, Nevins married a lawyer who also attended Yale. Though she wanted to pursue a theater career, her husband wanted her to be home evenings and weekends, forcing her to find a daytime job. The marriage ended in divorce.

In 1972, Nevins married investment banker Sidney Koch. The pair had a home in Litchfield, Connecticut and an apartment on the Upper East Side of Manhattan. They have one son, David Koch (born 1980). She has discussed her son's struggle with Tourette syndrome and her struggle to be a working mother with a son who was ill. Nevins has said that the 2007 HBO series, Addiction, was inspired by her son's struggles with substance abuse.

Nevins produced an HBO documentary about the Triangle Shirtwaist Factory fire called Triangle: Remembering the Fire, to which she had a personal connection, which she found out about after seeing the documentary Schmatta. Nevins' great-aunt Celia Gittlin, a 17-year-old immigrant from Russia, had died in the fire.

Nevins enjoys theater and is an admirer of Gloria Steinem, who she has deemed "next to my mother, the most important woman I’ve ever met."

Honors and awards 
 2000: Broadcasting & Cable Hall of Fame
 2008: Gotham Awards, Tribute Award – shared with Penélope Cruz, Melvin Van Peebles, and Gus Van Sant
 2011: Directors Guild of America, Power 100
 2013: Women's Project Theater, Woman of Achievement Award 
 2013: International Festival of Arts & Ideas, Visionary Leadership Award

Cable Ace Awards
 1995: Documentary Special for Gang War: Bangin' In Little Rock
 1997: Documentary Special for Heart of a Child

Peabody Awards
 1981: Peabody Award for She's Nobody's Baby: The History of American Women in the 20th Century – shared by HBO and Ms. magazine
 1999: Peabody Award, Personal Award
 2006: Peabody Award for Baghdad ER
 2013: Peabody Award for Mea Maxima Culpa: Silence in the House of God and for Life According to Sam

Primetime Emmy Awards

 1995: Outstanding Informational Special for One Survivor Remembers
 1995: Outstanding Informational Special for Taxicab Confessions
 1995: Outstanding Children's Program for Going, Going, Almost Gone! Animals in Danger
 1997: Outstanding Informational Special for Without Pity: A Film About Abilities
 1997: Outstanding Children's Program for How Do You Spell God?
 1999: Outstanding Nonfiction Special for Thug Life in D.C.
 2000: Outstanding Nonfiction Special for Children in War
 2000: Outstanding Children's Program for Goodnight Moon & Other Sleepytime Tales
 2003: Outstanding Children's Program for Through a Child's Eyes: September 11, 2001
 2004: Outstanding Variety, Music or Comedy Special for Elaine Stritch at Liberty
 2004: Outstanding Children's Program for Happy to Be Nappy and Other Stories of Me
 2005: Lifetime Achievement Award
 2005: Outstanding Children's Program for Classical Baby
 2005: Exceptional Merit in Documentary Filmmaking for Death in Gaza
 2006: Outstanding Children's Program for I Have Tourette's but Tourette's Doesn't Have Me
 2006: Exceptional Merit in Documentary Filmmaking for Baghdad ER
 2007: Outstanding Nonfiction Special for Ghosts of Abu Ghraib
 2007: Exceptional Merit in Documentary Filmmaking for When the Levees Broke: A Requiem in Four Acts
 2008: Outstanding Children's Program for Classical Baby (I'm Grown Up Now): The Poetry Show
 2008: Exceptional Merit in Documentary Filmmaking for White Light/Black Rain: The Destruction of Hiroshima and Nagasaki
 2009: Governor's Award for the Creative Arts Emmy Awards
 2009: Exceptional Merit in Documentary Filmmaking for The Alzheimer's Project: The Memory Loss Tapes
 2009: Outstanding Children's Nonfiction Program for The Alzheimer's Project: Grandpa, Do You Know Who I Am? with Maria Shriver
 2010: Outstanding Nonfiction Special for Teddy: In His Own Words
 2011: Outstanding Children's Program for A Child's Garden of Poetry
 2013: Outstanding Documentary or Nonfiction Special for Manhunt: The Search for Bin Laden
 2013: Exceptional Merit in Documentary Filmmaking for Mea Maxima Culpa: Silence in the House of God
 2014: Outstanding Children's Program for One Last Hug: Three Days at Grief Camp
 2014: Exceptional Merit in Documentary Filmmaking for Life According to Sam
 2015: Outstanding Documentary or Nonfiction Series for The Jinx: The Life and Deaths of Robert Durst
 2015: Outstanding Documentary or Nonfiction Special for Going Clear: Scientology and the Prison of Belief
 2015: Outstanding Picture Editing For Nonfiction Programming for The Jinx: The Life and Deaths of Robert Durst
 2016: Exceptional Merit in Documentary Filmmaking for Jim: The James Foley Story
 2018: Outstanding Documentary or Nonfiction Special for The Zen Diaries of Garry Shandling

Selected filmography 
 1981: She's Nobody's Baby: The History of American Women in the 20th Century – HBO and Ms. magazine
 1983–1985: Braingames – creator, executive producer
 1991–2005: America Undercover – executive producer
 1995: One Survivor Remembers – senior producer
 1997: 4 Little Girls – executive producer
 2001: Living Dolls: The Making of a Child Beauty Queen – executive producer

Works and publications

References

Further reading

External links

 
 
 Profile of Nevins at The Paley Center for Media

1939 births
Living people
American entertainment industry businesspeople
American people of Russian-Jewish descent
Barnard College alumni
Emmy Award winners
Fiorello H. LaGuardia High School alumni
HBO people
Little Red School House alumni
MTV executives
Women television executives
Peabody Award winners
People from the Lower East Side
People from the Upper East Side
Primetime Emmy Award winners
Television producers from New York City
American women television producers
Yale School of Drama alumni
21st-century American women